Erdal Erzincan (born 1971) is a Turkish Alevi folk music musician, composer, and singer. In 1981, he moved to Istanbul and studied bağlama at the Arif Sağ music school in 1985. Since 1989, he has been studying music at Istanbul Technical University. He has conducted research on the selpe method, which is a method for playing bağlama without a plectrum, similar to the tapping method on guitar.

He released his first album “tore” in 1994.

During his career, he has worked with Turkish folk musicians Tolga Sağ, İsmail Özden, Yılmaz Çelik, Muharrem Temiz, Arif Sağ, and Erol Parlak. In 2004, he recorded an album with Iranian-Kurdish musician Kayhan Kalhor.

Erdal Erzincan is married to Mercan Erzincan and has one child.

Discography 
 Töre (1994)
 Garip (1996)
 Türküler Sevdamız (1997) – With İsmail Özden and Tolga Sağ
 Concerto For Bağlama (1998) – Instrumental – With Arif Sağ and Erol Parlak
 Gurbet Yollarında (1999)
 Anadolu (2000) – Instrumental
 Türküler Sevdamız 2 (2001) – With Tolga Sağ and Yılmaz Çelik
 Al Mendil (2002)
 Türküler Sevdamız 3 (2005) – Together with Tolga Sağ, Muharrem Temiz and Yılmaz Çeli
 Kervan (2006)
 The Wind (ECM, 2006) – Instrumental, with Kayhan Kalhor
 Giriftar (2008)
 Girdab-ı Mihnet (2011)
 Kula Kulluk Yakışır Mı (ECM, 2013) with Kayhan Kalhor
 Karasu (2016) – Instrumental
 Döngü (2018)
 Bağlama İçin Besteler (2019)
 Beş Bağlama Konserleri (2019)
 Şelpe (2019) – Instrumental

External links
 Erdal Erzincan

1971 births
Living people
People from Erzurum
Turkish folk singers
21st-century Turkish singers
21st-century Turkish male singers